Centerville is a small community in the Town of Saugerties, Ulster County, New York, United States.

References

Hamlets in Ulster County, New York